Giulio Onesti (4 January 1912 - 11 December 1981) was an Italian sports director, that was president of the Italian National Olympic Committee for 32 years, from 1946 to 1978 (after 2 years as Special Commissioner of the same organization).

References

External links 
 L'onesta (e curiosa) storia di Giulio Onesti 

1912 births
1981 deaths
Italian sports directors